Street is the debut studio album by South Korean girl group EXID. The album was released digitally and physically on June 1, 2016. The album contains thirteen tracks with the lead single, "L.I.E".

The album was a commercial success peaking at number 2 on the Gaon Album Chart. The album has sold over 20,278 physical copies as of December 2016.

Background and release
On April 19, 2016 BANANA Culture announced that EXID would have a comeback of first week in June with their first studio album. The album was named the third best Kpop album of 2016 by Billboard. The article noted, "The strongest girl-group output of 2016, EXID finally got the chance to show what they were capable of with a full-length album of offbeat-yet-trendy dance tracks that delivered on the promise they showed so early in the career. 'L.I.E' is an aggressive pop banger, but slick songs like "Cream," "Don't Want a Drive" and "No Way" rival it for best and most accessible song on the album."

Promotion
EXID held a live showcase on June 1, 2016 and performed "L.I.E"  and "Don't Want a Drive" on MBC's Show Champion.

Commercial performance 
Street entered and peaked at number 2 on the Gaon Album Chart on the chart issue dated May 29 - June 4, 2016. In its second week, the album charted at number 33. In its third week, the album saw a rise to number 29, after dropping the chart the following week.

The album entered at number 7 on the Gaon Album Chart for the month of June 2016, with 18,960 physical copies sold. The album also entered at number 100 on the chart for the year 2016, with 20,278 physical copies sold.

Track listing

Charts

References

EXID albums
2016 debut albums
Korean-language albums